Thaiba is a village and former Village Development Committee that is now part of Godawari Municipality in Province No. 3 of central Nepal. At the time of the 1991 Nepal census it had a population of 4500 living in 805 individual households among which most of the population is inhabited by newars, the dominant population group of kathmandu valley. Here is a great problem of safe drinking water as it does not have clean and fresh water resources. People depend on a tap water provided by the government.

References

External links

UN map of the municipalities of Lalitpur District

Populated places in Lalitpur District, Nepal